Eric Brill is a computer scientist specializing in natural language processing. He created the Brill tagger, a supervised part of speech tagger. Another research paper of Brill introduced a machine learning technique now known as transformation-based learning.

Biography
Eric earned a BA in mathematics from the University of Chicago in 1987 and a MS in Computer Science from UT Austin in 1989.  In 1994, he completed his PhD at the University of Pennsylvania.  He was an assistant professor at Johns Hopkins University from 1994 to 1999. In 1999, he left JHU for Microsoft Research, he developed a system called "Ask MSR" that answered search engine queries written as questions in English, and was quoted in 2004 as predicting only brief success for Google's search engine business. In 2009 he moved to eBay to head their research laboratories.

References

Artificial intelligence researchers
Living people
Year of birth missing (living people)
Place of birth missing (living people)
Johns Hopkins University faculty
University of Texas at Austin College of Natural Sciences alumni
University of Chicago alumni
University of Pennsylvania alumni
Natural language processing researchers
Computational linguistics researchers